Corey Hughes (born 17 February 1978) is an Australian former professional rugby league footballer who played in the 1990s and 2000s. A City New South Wales representative , he played in the National Rugby League (NRL) for Canterbury-Bankstown and Cronulla-Sutherland Sharks. Corey Hughes is the youngest brother of former Bulldogs players, Glen Hughes and Steven Hughes. He is the son of former Canterbury five-eighth, Garry Hughes.

Background
Hughes was born in Sydney, New South Wales, Australia.

Playing career
Hughes made his first grade debut for Canterbury in round 8 of the 1998 NRL season against the Adelaide Rams at Belmore Oval, scoring a try during a 30-4 victory.

In the 1998 NRL season, Hughes played 15 games as Canterbury finished 9th on the table and qualified for the finals.  Canterbury proceeded to make the 1998 NRL Grand Final after winning 4 sudden death elimination matches in a row including the club's famous preliminary final victory over rivals Parramatta which is considered to be one of the greatest comebacks of all time.  After being 18-2 down with less than 10 minutes remaining, Canterbury scored 3 tries to take the game into extra-time before winning the match 32-20.

In the 2002 NRL season, Hughes played 24 games as the club went undefeated through most of the year winning their first 16 games. It was then revealed that Canterbury had exceeded the NRL's salary cap by $2 million over 3 years including undisclosed payments made to players. As a result, the NRL fined Canterbury $500,000 and stripped them of all their 37 competition points meaning that the club would finish the 2002 season with the wooden spoon.

He played for Canterbury from the interchange bench in their 2004 NRL Grand Final victory over cross-town rivals, the Sydney Roosters. As 2004 NRL premiers, the Canterbury faced Super League IX champions, the Leeds Rhinos in the 2005 World Club Challenge. Hughes played at half back in the Canterbury's 32-39 loss.

In 2005, Hughes was involved in a brawl at the Kembla Grange Racecourse after being taunted by opposition supporters. He was fined by the Canterbury club but refused to pay it.

Hughes signed a one-year deal with the Cronulla-Sutherland Sharks for 2009 and retired at the end of the year.

References

External links
NRL profile

1978 births
Living people
Australian rugby league players
Canterbury-Bankstown Bulldogs players
Cronulla-Sutherland Sharks players
Corey
New South Wales City Origin rugby league team players
Rugby league hookers
Rugby league players from Sydney
Sportsmen from New South Wales